Parks Place is an Italianate-style house in College Grove, Tennessee that was listed on the National Register of Historic Places in 1984.  It has also been known as the William Felix Webb House.  It was built between 1864 and 1872 for William Felix Webb, a businessman.  Webb sold the house in 1888 to Joseph T. Demumbrane.  It was sold in 1910 with 352 remaining acres to Arthur R. Parks, who occupied it until the 1940s.

References

Houses on the National Register of Historic Places in Tennessee
Houses in Williamson County, Tennessee
Italianate architecture in Tennessee
Houses completed in 1864
National Register of Historic Places in Williamson County, Tennessee